The Most Reverend John Bosco Panya Kritcharoen (born December 18, 1949) is the bishop of the Roman Catholic diocese of Ratchaburi, Thailand.

Born in Bangtan-Banpong, Ratchaburi province, he studied in Thailand and the United States. He was ordained as priest on May 22, 1976, in Ratchaburi, and then worked as assistant priest, parish priest, as well as school headmaster, rector of the diocesan minor seminary, director of the Centre for Evangelisation, member of the Commission for the Pontifical Mission Societies, president of the Commission for Evangelisation of Peoples and pastoral care for health workers.

While serving as parish priest of Chombung, he was appointed as the bishop of the diocese of Ratchaburi by Pope John Paul II on March 18, 2005. He was consecrated on May 28 by Cardinal Michael Michai Kitbunchu.

External links
Vatican press release about his appointment

21st-century Roman Catholic bishops in Thailand
1949 births
Living people
Panya Kritcharoen